Jackson Christian School is a private Christian school located in Jackson, Tennessee.  Founded in 1976, Jackson Christian School provides education for students from Pre-K through high school.

History
Jackson Christian School was founded in 1976 as a Christian school for students in grades 1 through 8, with an original enrollment of 58 students.  Three years later, Jackson Christian School moved from its original location at the Central Church of Christ in Jackson, Tennessee to its current 28-acre facility.

Campus
The school's current campus was built in 1979. It includes two gymnasiums, multiple computer labs, and a library.

Preschool location
Jackson Christian School has a preschool program in a separate location than the primary campus.  Located at Campbell Street Church of Christ, the preschool program is for children ages 2–4.

References

Christian schools in Tennessee
Educational institutions established in 1976
Jackson, Tennessee
Private K-12 schools in Tennessee
Schools in Madison County, Tennessee
1976 establishments in Tennessee